The Exchange Session may refer to:
The Exchange Session Vol. 1, a 2006 album by Kieran Hebden and Steve Reid
The Exchange Session Vol. 2, a 2006 album by Kieran Hebden and Steve Reid